XHSAW-TDT was a television station in Sabinas Hidalgo and Monterrey, Nuevo León, Mexico. It was owned by Multimedios Televisión and broadcast on physical channel 21.

History
XHSAW received its concession on August 1, 1994. The original concessionaire was Multimedios head Francisco Antonio González Sánchez.

The concession for XHSAW was not renewed, with the station closing on December 31, 2021.

Digital television 
The station's digital signal is multiplexed:

On September 24, 2015, XHSAW shut off its analog signal; its digital signal on UHF channel 21 remained. Until 2016, XHSAW shared major virtual channel 12 with XHAW-TDT. It used channel 13 between 2017 and 2018, when it moved back to 12 after Multimedios's other stations changed to channel 6.

On March 4, 2020, the IFT authorized the removal of Milenio TV in favor of sports channel xMD, now as the main HD subchannel, with Teleritmo moving to subchannel 2; the change is part of a move that also saw Milenio TV move to XHAW proper. The move never took place, as Multimedios opted not to make the change.

References

Television stations in Monterrey
Grupo Multimedios
Spanish-language television stations in Mexico
Television channels and stations disestablished in 2021
2021 disestablishments in Mexico